A ferreruolo is a form of a cape, which was popular among Spanish men during the 16th century.

The garment permitted the wearer ease of access to his sword.

References 

Spanish clothing